Abu al-Qasim Muhammad ibn Abbad (or Abbad I; 984 – 25 January 1042) was the eponymous founder of the Abbadid dynasty; he was the first independent Muslim ruler of Seville in Al-Andalus ruling from 1023 until his death in 1042.

Abu al-Qasim Muhammad ibn Abbad was a qadi (religious judge) when he was named governor of Seville by the caliph of Cordoba, Yahya ibn Ali ibn Hammud al-Mu'tali, in 1023.  However, with the Caliphate of Cordoba losing its integrity, the Abbadids, a Sevillan family of Arabic origins, seized control.

As a result, later in 1023, Abu al-Qasim Muhammad ibn Abbad declared Seville independent from Córdoban rule, establishing the taifa of Seville.

Sources

References

984 births
1042 deaths
Abbadid dynasty
11th-century rulers in Al-Andalus
11th-century Arabs